Axinidris mlalu is a species of ant in the genus Axinidris. Described by Snelling in 2007, the species is known to be from the Central African Republic, found on vegetation in rainforests.

References

Endemic fauna of the Central African Republic
Axinidris
Hymenoptera of Africa
Insects described in 2007